Zusidava tortricaria is a moth in the family Drepanidae. It was described by Francis Walker in 1863. It is found on Borneo.

References

Moths described in 1863
Drepaninae
Taxa named by Francis Walker (entomologist)
Moths of Borneo